Nina Brodskaya (born 11 December 1947 or 1949, Moscow) is a Soviet singer (soprano), popular in the 1960s and 1970s.

Biography 
After graduating from the Music College of the Moscow State Institute of Music in 1965, Nina Brodskaya started working as a singer in the Eddie Rosner Jazz Orchestra, while continuing her music education at the All-Russia Creative Workshop of Variety Art. Among the songs that made her famous were: "Love is a Ring" ("Любовь-кольцо") and "August" ("Август") by Frenkel, "One Snowflake is Not Yet Snow" ("Ты говоришь мне о любви" a.k.a. "Одна снежинка ещё не снег") by Kolmanovsky, "There's No Use in Your Coming to Me" ("Ходишь напрасно") and "First Love" ("Первая любовь") by Mazhukov. She is also famous for singing the song "January Blizzard" ("Звенит январская вьюга") by Zatsepin for the 1973 movie Ivan Vasilievich: Back to the Future. Since 1980 Nina Brodskaya lives and performs in the USA, since 1990s occasionally coming to Russia.

References

External links 
 
 

1949 births
Living people
Musicians from Moscow
Soviet women singers
Soviet emigrants to the United States